The Hinze Dam is a rock and earth-fill embankment dam with an un-gated spillway across the Nerang River in the Gold Coast hinterland of South East, Queensland, Australia. The main purpose of the dam is for potable water supply of the Gold Coast region. The impounded reservoir is called Advancetown Lake.

Hinze Dam was named in honour of local pioneers Carl and Johanna Hinze (grandparents of Queensland politician Russ Hinze) who lived in the valley that was flooded by the dam. The dam is almost always full, reaching 96% of capacity even during dry spells.

Location and features

The  dam wall holds back the  reservoir when at full capacity. Initially managed by the Gold Coast City Council up until 2008, the dam is now managed by Seqwater.

The dam also provides the benefit of flood mitigation to populated areas along the Nerang River downstream of the dam.

Construction

The Southport Town Council planned the dam in 1947. It was completed in 1976 and expanded in 1989 and 2011.

Stage One was completed in 1976, and provided  of potable water storage and supply.

In 2004 the Gold Coast City Council resolved to construct Stage 3 of the dam. When the dam reached full capacity, on 7 January 2008 work began on Stage 3 and was completed on 19 December 2011. After nearly four years of construction the construction cost was A$395 million. Stage 3 construction was completed by the Hinze Dam Alliance, a joint venture between Seqwater, with private sector partners URS Corporation, Sinclair Knight Merz and Thiess. The additional works with a higher dam wall provided  homes below the dam wall with flood protection from a 1974 Brisbanestyle flood event.

The eastern boat ramp is located in Mudgeeraba and features a craft and paddle launching platform as well as toilets and bin facilities. The western boat ramp, located in Springbrook, contains the same amenities with a smaller car park. In 2012 a body was discovered by fishermen.

Recreation
Advancetown Lake is a popular recreational facility for Gold Coast residents. Since the Stage 3 upgrade, recreational activities allowed include walking, electric or manual-powered boating, fishing, biking and horse riding. The facilities are open from 6 am to 6 pm daily. No camping is permitted around the lake. Dogs are also not permitted, while swimming has been strongly discouraged. An interpretive centre was opened on 19 December 2011, along with new parking, walking trails, toilet facilities and barbecue areas.

The final design of the dam was criticised in the media and by residents and politicians, some describing it as a "concrete bunker". The criticism arose because of a reduction in playground, boating and barbecue facilities; the banning of dogs; the extensive use of concrete; and because many of the facilities are either far from the water's edge or below the dam wall with no water views.

Advancetown Lake has two boat ramps, one on the western and another on the eastern side.

Fishing
The dam is stocked with Mary River cod, silver perch, golden perch, southern saratoga and bass, while spangled perch are also present naturally. Banded grunter have been found in the lake and being illegally introduced, it is recommended that, if caught, they should be destroyed. A Gold Coast City Council permit is required to fish in the dam. A Queensland State Government Stocked Impoundment Permit is not required.

From December 2018, Queensland Health advise not to consume fish from Hinze Dam due to elevated levels of mercury in recent fish samples.

2018 Commonwealth Games
The Gold Coast hosted the 2018 Commonwealth Games. The area surrounding the Hinze Dam was originally proposed as the location for the mountain bike competition. A new course was constructed to meet international competition requirements. Some government representatives as well as some mountain bikers have sought to have the competition moved away to the unsecured trails at Nerang State Forest. The Gold Coast Mountain Bike Club maintain the course and sometimes host a race on the circuit the first Sunday of each month.

See also

 Sports on the Gold Coast, Queensland
List of dams in Queensland

References

External links 

Advancetown Lake
2018 Commonwealth Games venues
Sports venues on the Gold Coast, Queensland
Buildings and structures on the Gold Coast, Queensland
Dams completed in 1976
Dams in Queensland
Mountain biking venues
1976 establishments in Australia
Embankment dams
Rock-filled dams
Earth-filled dams